Robert Szczot  (born January 31, 1982 in Oleśnica) is a Polish footballer.

He is equally adept in playing both in the right and left flank of the midfield.

Career

Early career
Szczot started his career for the amateur club Lotnik Twardogóra and continued in 2002 for Śląsk Wrocław. He continued to play for Śląsk Wrocław in the Polish First League (2nd tier) until the 2004–05 season.

RAEC Mons
Szczot chose to play abroad for the 2005–06 season and signed for the Belgian club R.A.E.C. Mons. He debuted for the club in the opening day of the league in an away 1–1 draw against Royal Antwerp F.C. His first goal in the Belgian Second Division was scored i a 4–1 home win against R.U. Saint-Gilloise. In the end of the season he totalled 16 matches and 2 goals in the league. R.A.E.C. Mons won the championship and thus gained promotion to the Jupiler Pro League.

Return to Poland
After his season in Belgium he returned in his former club Śląsk Wrocław. In the January transfer window he signed for Ekstraklasa outfit ŁKS Łódź. He debuted for his new club in a 2–1 away defeat against Wisła Płock. He featured in one more game in the season totalling a modest 2 games. In his second season for the club Szczot gained a spot in the starting eleven. He scored his first goal and handed an assist in the opening day of the 2007–08 Ekstraklasa season and in the end of the season he had 27 appearances for ŁKS Łódź and contributed 4 goals in his club's campaign. In the next season Szczot signed for Jagiellonia Białystok. He debuted for the club in its first match of the season, an away 1–1 draw against Arka Gdynia. He managed to score a goal for the club in a 2–0 home win over Lechia Gdańsk. He made 14 appearances for the club before signing for former giants Górnik Zabrze. He managed to make 13 appearances and scored one goal for his new club but the end of the season found Górnik Zabrze relegated in the Polish First League. In the 2009–10 season Szczot was a key player in Górnik's campaign to the second, promotion gaining, position in the Polish First League making 25 appearances and scoring 3 goals.

Iraklis
Szczot was the third transfer for Iraklis for the 2010–11 season. He debuted for Iraklis in a winning 1–0 home match against Larissa, coming in as a substitute for Kobayashi in the 74th minute.

ŁKS Łódź
In August 2011, he joined ŁKS Łódź.

Honours

RAEC Mons
Belgian Second Division (1) : 2005–06

Górnik Zabrze
Polish First League : Runner-Up 2009–10

References

External links
 
 

1982 births
Living people
Polish footballers
Polish expatriate footballers
Śląsk Wrocław players
ŁKS Łódź players
Górnik Zabrze players
Olimpia Grudziądz players
Iraklis Thessaloniki F.C. players
R.A.E.C. Mons players
Super League Greece players
Expatriate footballers in Greece
Expatriate footballers in Belgium
People from Oleśnica
Sportspeople from Lower Silesian Voivodeship
Association football midfielders